The Frome Hoard is a hoard of 52,503 Roman coins found in April 2010 by metal detectorist Dave Crisp near Frome in Somerset, England. The coins were contained in a ceramic pot  in diameter, and date from AD 253 to 305. Most of the coins are made from debased silver or bronze. The hoard is one of the largest ever found in Britain, and is also important as it contains the largest group ever found of coins issued during the reign of Carausius, who ruled Britain independently from 286 to 293 and was the first Roman Emperor to strike coins in Britain. The Museum of Somerset in Taunton, using a grant from the National Heritage Memorial Fund (NHMF), acquired the hoard in 2011 for a value of £320,250.

Discovery and excavation

Discovery

The hoard was discovered on 11 April 2010 while Crisp was metal detecting in a field near Frome where he had previously found late Roman silver coins. The late Roman coins, eventually totalling 62, were probably the remnants of a scattered hoard, 111 of which had been found on the same farm in 1867. Whilst searching for more coins from the scattered hoard he received what he called a "funny signal" and on digging down about  he found a small radiate coin, and the top of a small pot. Realising that this must be an intact coin hoard he stopped digging and filled in the hole he had made. In 22 years of detecting Crisp had never made such a significant find.

Excavation
On 15 April, Crisp notified Katie Hinds, the Portable Antiquities Scheme Finds Liaison Officer for Wiltshire, that he had found the hoard of coins. On 22 April Hinds, together with Anna Booth (Finds Liaison Officer for Somerset) and Alan Graham—an independent archaeologist contracted by Somerset County Council—visited the site to carry out an emergency excavation. The excavation, led by Graham and assisted by Hinds, Booth, Crisp and members of the landowner's family, was performed over three days, from 23 to 25 April.

Graham initially excavated a  trench around the small hole that Crisp had dug, and identified the pit in which the pot had been deposited. A small black-burnished ware bowl had been inverted over the mouth of the larger pot, to form a lid. First he excavated the pit fill around the exterior of the pot, identifying organic matter which might represent packing material to protect it, and determined that the pot had been broken in situ long before its discovery in 2010. He then excavated the pot itself. Due to the weight of the contents, the need for speedy excavation due to security concerns and the difficulty in lifting the broken pot with the contents still inside—which would be the preferred archaeological method, so that the contents could be excavated in controlled, laboratory conditions—the decision was taken to excavate the coins in the field. The coins were removed in layers, by which method it was hoped to determine if there was any chronological pattern in the deposition of the coins; that is, whether the earliest coins were at the bottom and latest coins at the top. Graham excavated and recorded the finds, and the others bagged the coins as Graham lifted them out.

Given the weight of the coins, it is thought that it would not have been possible to carry the filled pot to the site: the pot would probably have been buried and the coins tipped in.

After the hoard had been lifted, an archaeological geophysics team was contracted to investigate the area around the hoard but failed to find any evidence of settlement.

Conservation
On 26 April, Sam Moorhead, Finds Advisor for Iron Age and Roman coins at the British Museum, and Roger Bland, Head of the Department of Portable Antiquities and Treasure at the British Museum, drove to Frome to collect the excavated coins, and drove them back to the British Museum in London. Over the next six weeks Metals Conservator Pippa Pearce washed and dried all the coins in order to stabilise them, but did not perform a full conservation, which would have cost an additional £35,000.

Items discovered

The coins comprise 67 separate types, and date from the period 253 to 305. The vast majority of coins are made from bronze, but five are made from solid silver.

Of the 52,503 coins found, 44,245 have been identified, and the remainder are classified provisionally as "illegible" until cleaning and conservation has been completed. Of the identifiable coins, 14,788 were minted under the central Roman Empire, 28,377 were minted under the breakaway Gallic Empire, and 766 were minted under the Britannic Empire of Carausius, as shown in the table below. About 5% of the coins identified so far are from the period of Carausius, who ruled Britain from 286 to 293, and the hoard includes five silver denarii issued by Carausius, which were the only type of silver coin to be struck anywhere in the Roman Empire at that time.

Purpose
Most Roman coin hoards are traditionally believed to have been buried by their owners for safe-keeping, with the intention of being eventually recovered, but Sam Moorhead of the Portable Antiquities Scheme suggests that in this case the pot was so large and fragile that it could not have been easily recovered without breaking it, and so the hoard may represent communal votive offerings to the gods.

Inquest and valuation
A coroner's treasure inquest was held on 22 July 2010 to determine the status of the hoard. The inquest declared that the coins were treasure, and therefore became property of the Crown. However, under the terms of the 1996 Treasure Act, a museum may purchase the hoard at an officially valued price, with the purchase price being given jointly to the finder and landowner as a reward. Somerset County Council Heritage Service indicated that it wished to acquire the hoard, and put the coins on display in the new Museum of Somerset in Taunton when it re-opened in 2011.

In October 2010, the hoard was valued by the Treasure Valuation Committee at £320,250, and a public appeal was launched by the Art Fund to raise this amount of money so that the hoard can be purchased by the Museum of Somerset. If the museum succeeded in raising the required money by the deadline of 1 February 2011, it would be shared equally between the finder, Dave Crisp, and the landowners, Geoff and Anne Sheppard, as a reward.

The Art Fund gave an initial £40,250 to the appeal fund. The British Museum donated 50p for each copy sold of the book about the hoard, by Moorhead et al., which was published by the museum (see Further Reading, below).

Display

A selection of the coins were put on display at the British Museum on 8 July 2010 for a press photocall, and the entire hoard was subsequently displayed in Gallery 68 of the British Museum between 15 July and 31 August 2010. Some of the coins from the hoard were exhibited at Frome Library on 22 July 2010, and again on 23 October 2010.

The find was included as part of a BBC Two television programme, Digging for Britain, presented by Alice Roberts in August 2010.

With the help of a grant from the National Heritage Memorial Fund (NHMF) the Museum of Somerset in Taunton acquired the hoard in 2011 at the official value of £320,250. The grant from NHMF included £105,000 for conservation work.

The hoard was put on permanent display at the Museum of Somerset when it reopened on 29 September 2011.

See also
 List of hoards in Great Britain
 Roman currency

Notes

Footnotes

Further reading

External links

 Portable Antiquities Scheme: The Frome Hoard
 Pictures of the Frome Hoard on Flickr
 Time lapse video of the excavation of the pot
 
 Roman hoard of coins at Digging for Britain, BBC Two, broadcast 16 September 2010.

Treasure troves in England
Treasure troves of Roman Britain
History of Somerset
Frome
2010 archaeological discoveries
Metal detecting finds in England
Hoards from Roman Britain
Coin hoards